Elk Hill is a hamlet in Saskatchewan.

Unincorporated communities in Saskatchewan
Nipawin No. 487, Saskatchewan